Numon Khasanov is an Uzbekistan football forward who played for Uzbekistan in the 1996 Asian Cup.

Career
Khasanov played for Pakhtakor, MHSK Tashkent, Rubin, Dustlik, Nasaf Qarshi and Traktor Tashkent.
He won his first championship in Uzbek League with Pakhtakor Tashkent in 1992. In 1997, he won Uzbek League with MHSK Tashkent and twice with Dustlik in 1999, 2000.

In 1998, he moved to Rubin Kazan and completed 8 matches for the club.
His last station was Lokomotiv Tashkent where he played in 2009. He scored 126 goals in Uzbek League, entering Gennadi Krasnitsky club. In his career he scored in all competitions totally 153 goals.

Managerial career
In 2012, he was appointed as head coach of Pakhtakors farm club, Pakhtakor-2 Chilanzar. On 24 July 2012, Numon Khasanov resigned his position and was appointed as head coach of Pakhtakor Youth team. He won with Pakhtakor Youth in 2012 Uzbek Youth League, the championship of youth squads of Uzbek League teams. In January 2014 he was appointed as assistant coach to Samvel Babayan who was named as new trainer of Pakhtakor.

On 7 July 2015, he was named as head coach of Pakhtakor after Samvel Babayan resigned his post to take charge of Uzbek national team.

Honours

Player
Pakhtakor
 Soviet First League runners-up: 1991
 Uzbek League (1): 1992
 Uzbek Cup (1): 1992

MHSK Tashkent
 Uzbek League (1): 1997
 with Dustlik:
 Uzbek League (2): 1999, 2000
 Uzbek Cup (1): 2000

Manager
Pakhtakor
 Uzbek League (1): 2015

Individual
 Uzbekistan Footballer of the Year 3rd: 1999
 Gennadi Krasnitsky club: 153 goals

References

External links

Player profile at 11v11

Uzbekistani footballers
Living people
1971 births
Soviet footballers
Uzbekistani expatriate footballers
Uzbekistani expatriate sportspeople in Russia
Expatriate footballers in Russia
People from Jizzakh Region
Association football forwards
FC Rubin Kazan players
Uzbekistan international footballers
Uzbekistani football managers
FC Dustlik managers
Pakhtakor Tashkent FK managers
Uzbekistani expatriate football managers